The 300th Sustainment Brigade is a Major Subordinate Command (MSC) of the 4th Expeditionary Sustainment Command (4th ESC) and one of only eight of its kind in the Army Reserve.  This unit is one of the latest additions in the Army Transformation process for the 4th ESC, and manage a peacetime downtrace that has command and control of approximately 3,500 Army Reservists located throughout the Texas area, and its Soldiers support diverse missions that are logistical in nature.

Subordinate Units
The brigade is made up of the following units:
 300th Headquarters and Headquarters Company
 15th Team Petrol (Quality Assurance) 
 320th Team Petrol Liaison 
 350th Company Personnel (Human Resources) 
 513th Detachment Support (Theatre Distribution Augmentation Element)
 645th Detachment (Petrol Liaison)  
 957th Company (Petrol Support)
 411th Company (Petrol Support)
 363rd Quartermaster Battalion
 363rd Headquarters and Headquarters Detachment (Petrol & Terminal OP) 
 328th Quartermaster Company Personnel (Human Resources) 
 340th Quartermaster Company (Field Services) (Mission Operations Directorate) 
 223rd Quartermaster Company (Support Maintenance) 
 141st Quartermaster Company (Petrol & Terminal OP)

Mission
The 300th Sustainment Brigade mission is to plan, coordinate, synchronize, monitor, and control Logistics Operations within an assigned area of responsibility.  The Brigade also coordinates Host Nation Support (HNS) and contracting, as well as providing support to joint, interagency, and multinational forces as directed.

History
The 300th Sustainment Brigade's history began on 26 June 1945 as the 300th Transportation Group.  The unit activated on 29 June 1945 in France, and was inactivated in France on 22 November 1945.  The 300th was redesignated as the 300th Transportation Corps Service Group on 2 December 1946 and allotted to the Organized Reserves.  On 12 December 1946 the unit was activated in Baltimore, Maryland.  During that timeframe, the Organized Reserves became the Army Reserve on 9 July 1952.  The unit inactivated on 29 August, and during inactivation was redesignated as the 300th Transportation Group on 3 April 1959. The unit changed locations several more times to include Fort George Meade, Maryland, on 1 November 1960; Andrew Air Force Base, Maryland, on 20 May 1964; and Butler, Pennsylvania, on 31 January 1968.  The 300th moved from Butler, Pennsylvania, on 18 September 2009  where it was redesignated and activated as the first Army Reserve Sustainment Command in the state of Texas.  An activation ceremony was held on 19 April 2008 in Grand Prairie at the Armed Forces Reserve Complex.  The 300th was activated for mobilization to Kuwait and supporting areas in October 2018 in support of Operation Spartan Shield and Operation Inherent Resolve to provide logistical support for the warfighters. The 300th has since completed their rotation in July 2019 respectively.

References

The Institute of Heraldry: 300th Sustainment Brigade

300
Military units and formations established in 2008